Destrozado y sin control is the first album by the Peruvian singer Shaw, launched in 2010. The singles "Destrozado y sin control" and "Una vez más" had rotation on MTV. Shaw participated in the Festival de Viña del Mar in the international category with her song "Destrozado y sin control" .

Background and release
The album was released in 2010 as Shaw's debut as a solo artist. The album contains nine tracks in the genres of Rock, Ballad, and Electronic rhythms. The album was produced by Latin Grammy Award nominated producer Francisco Murias. Shaw stated that she had been working on this album since the age of 16.

Commercial performance
The album had success in Perú, causing Shaw to get recognition in the country and was selected to represent Perú at the Viña del Mar International Song Festival in 2011 where she performed Destrozado y sin control and ended up in second place. The song also entered the top 20 in the charts in Perú.

Critical reception

Users on the website Album of the Year gave the album a score of 60.

Track listing
 Destrozado y sin control
 Juegos
 Luz
 Una vez más
 Estúpida chica pop
 Mientes
 En Todo Momento
 Ven
 Don

References

External links
 Video of the song "Destrozado y sin control"
 Video of the song "Una vez más"

2010 debut EPs
Leslie Shaw albums